Club Deportivo Alcoyano, S.A.D. is a Spanish football team based in Alcoy, in the autonomous community of Valencia. Founded in 1928 it plays in Primera División RFEF – Group 2, holding home games in Estadio El Collao, with a 4,850-seat capacity. The team is also known by its name in Valencian, Alcoià.

A simile exists in Spanish which includes the name of this football club, "Tener más moral que el Alcoyano" ("To have more morale than Alcoyano"). The phrase possibly originated in the 1950s, when Alcoyano were losing a game by 0–13 at home but never gave up, still trying hard to score at the end of the match. However, this is disputed by some historians, with the origins being somewhat unclear. The official anthem of the club is "La moral del Alcoyano" (Alcoyano moral), music by Miguel Peidró and Jaime Lloret and lyrics by Armando Santacreu. It was composed in 1979 for the 50th anniversary of the club. In 2004, coinciding with the 75th anniversary of the club, the music was modernized and the anthem performed by the singer José Zamora.

History
The city of Alcoy had a very important club, the Boxing Club Deportivo Alcoyano. In 1927 its football section won a large number of games against major clubs which led to the formation of the football club. Club Deportivo Alcoyano saw the light in 1928, after a merger between two clubs in the city, Levante and Racing. However, it only joined the Royal Spanish Football Federation four years later.

In 1942, the club first reached the Segunda División, going on to alternate between that level and the top flight in the subsequent years. Their debut in the latter took place with a 2–3 home loss against Real Murcia, in an eventual relegation, as second from bottom. In that season the club got only 8 points and conceded 28 goals in 14 games played, the worst result among 8 teams. For the first time in history Alcoyano reached La Liga, first Spanish division, in 1945 by winning Segunda División.

In 1947–48, Alcoyano maintained its first division status for the only time in its history, even finishing higher than Real Madrid. That season was the best in Alcoyano's history – the club finished in 10th position in La Liga. The following forty years, however, were spent mainly in the third and fourth divisions, with very brief spells in level two. In the 1953-54 season Alcoyano was relegated to the Tercera División for the first time in its history. In the 1954-55 season the club reached first place in the Group 10 of Tercera División, but failed to promote back to Segunda División B.

Alcoyano returned to the third category for 2004–05, consistently reached the promotion play-offs, and consistently failed to be promoted. In the 2005–06 season, the team also had a good run in the Spanish Cup, beating RCD Mallorca 4–1 and losing by just one goal (0–1) in the fourth round against Atlético Madrid.

In June 2011, 42 years after, Alcoyano finally returned to the second division, after finishing in third position in the regular season, and disposing of Real Madrid Castilla, SD Eibar and CD Lugo in the promotion playoffs. However, the club spent only one season in the second division and relegated back to Segunda División B. On 1 August 2014, the club completed the transformation process into "Public Limited Sports Company" (Sociedad Anónima Deportiva).

In the 2018–19 season, Alcoyano club finished 16th in the Segunda División B, Group 3, close to the relegation place.

On 20 January 2021, Alcoyano made history by eliminating Spanish giants and reigning La Liga champions Real Madrid from the 2020–21 Copa del Rey, beating them 2–1 at home.

Season to season

4 seasons in La Liga
12 seasons in Segunda División
2 seasons in Primera División RFEF
29 seasons in Segunda División B
31 seasons in Tercera División

Current squad
.

Reserve team

Famous players
Note: this list includes players that have played at least 100 league games and/or have reached international status. 
  Anselmo
 Sergio Barila
 Raúl Fabiani
 Anthony Lozano
 Antonio Calpe
 Manuel Carrión
 Jorge Devesa
 Manuel Gato
 Diego Jiménez
 Fernando Maestro
 Víctor Sanjuán
 David Porras
 Miku

Famous coaches
 Juande Ramos
 Manuel Ruiz Sosa

References

External links

Official website 
Futbolme team profile 
BDFutbol team profile

 
Football clubs in the Valencian Community
Association football clubs established in 1929
1929 establishments in Spain
Alcoy
Segunda División clubs
La Liga clubs
Primera Federación clubs
Football clubs in Spain